Raj Singh may refer to:

Raj Singh I (1629–1680), Rana of Mewar the maternal uncle of Ajit Singh of Marwar
Raj Singh II (1743–1761), son of Maharana Pratap Singh II
Raj Singh (businessman) (born 1964), Sukhraj 'Raj' Singh, Indian businessman
Jinder Mahal (born 1986), Canadian professional wrestler who has previous ring name as Tiger Raj Singh
Raj Singh (wrestler), Indian professional wrestler
Raj Kumar Singh Gautam (born 1966), Indian politician and businessman, founder and CMD of Gautam Group
Raj Kishor Singh, Indian politician from Uttar Pradesh
Raj Singh Dungarpur (1935–2009), former President of BCCI
Raj Singh Arora (born 1984), Indian actor and photographer
Annu Raj Singh (born 1984), Indian shooter from Aligarh
Raj Man Singh Chitrakar (1797–1865), Nepalese artist in the mid 19th century
Raj Kunwar Singh (1897–1968), noted zamindar and the Raja of Barauli Rao
Raj Singh Chaudhary, Indian actor from Darjeeling
Yogeshwar Raj Singh (born 1967), scion of Kawardha Raj
Giri Raj Singh Sirohi, first Indian to set foot on Antarctica

See also 
Raj (disambiguation)
Raj Kumar Singh (disambiguation)
 List of people with surname Singh